Nights of Cabiria is a 1957 drama film co-written and directed by Federico Fellini. It stars Giulietta Masina as Cabiria, a prostitute living in Rome. The cast also features François Périer and Amedeo Nazzari. The film is based on a story by Fellini, who expanded into a screenplay along with his co-writers Ennio Flaiano, Tullio Pinelli and Pier Paolo Pasolini.

Besides the best actress award at the Cannes Film Festival for Giulietta Masina, Nights of Cabiria won the 1957 Academy Award for Best Foreign Language Film. This was the second straight year Italy and Fellini won this Academy Award, having won for La Strada, which also starred Masina.

Plot
Prostitute Cabiria and her lover Giorgio playfully chase each other through a field and up to the bank of a river. Oblivious to Giorgio's criminal intentions, Cabiria stands close to the edge of the water, before being pushed in to the river, and having her purse and money stolen. She is quickly saved by a group of onlooking bystanders who prevent her from drowning.

Cabiria returns to her small home, but Giorgio has disappeared. She is bitter, and when her best friend and neighbor, Wanda, tries to help her get over him, Cabiria shoos her away and remains disgruntled. One night, she is outside an upscale nightclub and witnesses a fight between famous movie star Alberto Lazzari and his girlfriend. The irritated Lazzari takes the starstruck Cabiria to another club where they dance the mambo, before returning to the movie star's house, where Cabiria is astounded by its opulence. The two share an intimate moment in Lazzari's bedroom, but are quickly interrupted by the intrusion of Lazzari's previous girlfriend. Cabiria is told to wait out the night in the bathroom, and ends up watching Lazzari and his girlfriend reconcile their relationship through the keyhole of the bathroom door.

The following day, a church procession passes by the street where Cabiria and her friends hang out. As her associates mock the Church, Cabiria is drawn to the procession. Just as she is about to join the procession, a man driving a truck pulls up and offers her a ride home. As she heads home later that night, she sees a man giving food to the poor people living in caves near her house. She has never seen this man before, but she is both impressed and confused by his charity toward others.

The following day, Cabiria and some of her friends attend a church mass, where she pleads the Virgin Mary for a better life. After the procession ends, Cabiria expresses sadness at the fact that her friends seemed to have not changed anything about their lives.

Cabiria goes to a magic show, and the magician drags her up on stage and hypnotizes her. As the audience laughs, she acts out her desires to be married and live a happy life. Furious at having been taken advantage of for the audience's amusement, she leaves in a huff. Outside the theatre, a man named Oscar is waiting to talk to her. He was in the audience, and he says he agrees with her that it was not right for everyone to laugh, but believes that fate has brought them together. They go for a drink, and at first she is cautious and suspicious, but after several meetings she falls passionately in love with him; they are to be married after only a few weeks. Cabiria is delighted and sells her home and takes out all her money from the bank. The sum of more than 700,000 lire in cash represents her dowry, and when she shows it to Oscar in a restaurant, he advises her to keep it in the purse. However, during a walk in a wooded area, on a cliff overlooking a lake, Oscar becomes distant and starts acting nervous. Cabiria realizes that just like her earlier lover, Oscar intends to push her over the cliff and steal her money. She throws her purse at his feet, sobbing in convulsions on the ground and begging for him to kill her as he takes the money and abandons her.

She later picks herself up and stumbles out of the wood in tears. In the film's last sequence, Cabiria walks the long road back to town when she is met by a group of young people riding scooters, playing music, and dancing. They happily form an impromptu parade around her until she begins to smile, as a single black tear falls down her face.

Cast
 Giulietta Masina as Cabiria Ceccarelli
 François Périer as Oscar D'Onofrio
 Franca Marzi as Wanda
 Dorian Gray as Jessy
 Aldo Silvani as the wizard
 Ennio Girolami Amleto the pimp
 Amedeo Nazzari as Alberto Lazzari
 Franco Fabrizi as Giorgio (uncredited)

Production
The name Cabiria is borrowed from the 1914 Italian film Cabiria, while the character of Cabiria herself is taken from a brief scene in Fellini's earlier film, The White Sheik. It was Masina's performance in that earlier film that inspired Fellini to make Nights of Cabiria. However, no one in Italy was willing to finance a film which featured prostitutes as heroines. Finally, Dino de Laurentiis agreed to put up the money. Fellini based some of the characters on a real prostitute whom he had met while filming Il Bidone. For authenticity, he had Pier Paolo Pasolini, known for his familiarity with Rome's criminal underworld, help with the dialogue.

Nights of Cabiria was filmed in many areas around Italy, including Acilia, Castel Gandolfo, Cinecittà, Santuario della Madonna del Divino Amore, Porta Maggiore, the Baths of Caracalla and the Tiber River.

Reception
At the time of the film's first American release, The New York Times critic Bosley Crowther gave the film a mixed review: "Like La Strada and several other of the post-war Italian neo-realistic films, this one is aimed more surely toward the development of a theme than a plot. Its interest is not so much the conflicts that occur in the life of the heroine as the deep, underlying implications of human pathos that the pattern of her life shows...But there are two weaknesses in Cabiria. It has a sordid atmosphere and there is something elusive and insufficient about the character of the heroine. Her get-up is weird and illogical for the milieu in which she lives and her farcical mannerisms clash with the ugly realism of the theme." Upon its original 1957 release, on the other hand, French director François Truffaut thought Cabiria was Fellini's best film to date. The film ranked third on Cahiers du Cinéma's "Top 10 Films of the Year List" in 1957.

Forty years later, The New York Times carried a new review by Crowther's successor, Janet Maslin. She called the film "a cinematic masterpiece", and added that the final shot of Cabiria is worth more than "all the fire-breathing blockbusters Hollywood has to offer." This has stood by far as the most prevalent assessment of the artistic achievements of the film.

Film critic Roger Ebert reviewed mainly the plot and Fellini's background: "Fellini's roots as a filmmaker are in the postwar Italian Neorealist movement (he worked for Rossellini on Rome, Open City in 1945), and his early films have a grittiness that is gradually replaced by the dazzling phantasms of the later ones. Nights of Cabiria is transitional; it points toward the visual freedom of La Dolce Vita while still remaining attentive to the real world of postwar Rome. The scene involving the good samaritan provides a framework to show people living in city caves and under bridges, but even more touching is the scene where Cabiria turns over the keys of her house to the large and desperately poor family that has purchased it." He gave the film four stars out of four and included it in his Great Movies list.

In 1998, the film was re-released, newly restored and now including a crucial 7-minute sequence (with the man giving food to the poor people living in caves) that censors had cut after the premiere. The Village Voice ranked Nights of Cabiria at number 112 in its Top 250 "Best Films of the Century" list in 1999, based on a poll of critics.

The review aggregator Rotten Tomatoes reported that 100% of critics gave the film a positive review, based on 42 reviews. The consensus states: "Giulietta Masina is remarkable as a chronically unfortunate wretch with an indomitable spirit in Federico Fellini's unrelentingly bleak – yet ultimately uplifting – odyssey through heartbreak."

Awards
Wins
 Cannes Film Festival: Best Actress, Giulietta Masina; OCIC Award – Special Mention, Federico Fellini; 1957.
 David di Donatello Awards, Italy: David, Best Director, Federico Fellini; Best Production, Dino De Laurentiis; 1957.
 San Sebastián International Film Festival: Zulueta Prize, Best Actress, Giulietta Masina; 1957.
 Academy Awards: Oscar, Best Foreign Language Film, Italy; 1957. Recipients- Federico Fellini & Dino De Laurentiis
 Italian National Syndicate of Film Journalists: Silver Ribbon, Best Actress, Giulietta Masina; Best Director, Federico Fellini; Best Producer, Dino De Laurentiis; Best Supporting Actress, Franca Marzi; 1958.
 Sant Jordi Awards, Barcelona, Spain: Best Foreign Actress, Giulietta Masina; Best Foreign Director, Federico Fellini; Best Foreign Film, Federico Fellini; Best Foreign Screenplay, Ennio Flaiano, Tullio Pinelli and Pier Paolo Pasolini; 1959.
 Cinema Writers Circle Awards, Spain: CEC Award, Best Foreign Film, Italy; 1959.

Legacy
The American musical Sweet Charity (and its film adaptation) is based on Fellini's screenplay. In January 2002, the film (along with La Strada) was voted at No. 85 on the list of the "Top 100 Essential Films of All Time" by the National Society of Film Critics. The film was included at number 87 on BBC's 2018 list of "The 100 Greatest Foreign-Language Films", voted by 209 film critics from 43 countries around the world.

See also
 List of Italian films of 1957
 List of submissions to the 30th Academy Awards for Best Foreign Language Film
 List of Italian submissions for the Academy Award for Best Foreign Language Film

Notes

References

Bibliography

External links
 
 
 
 
 Nights of Cabiria at DVD Beaver (includes images)

1957 films
1957 drama films
1950s Italian-language films
Best Foreign Language Film Academy Award winners
Films about prostitution in Italy
Films directed by Federico Fellini
Films produced by Dino De Laurentiis
Films scored by Nino Rota
Films set in Rome
Films with screenplays by Federico Fellini
French black-and-white films
French drama films
Italian black-and-white films
Italian drama films
Paramount Pictures films
1950s Italian films
1950s French films